The 1999 Acura Classic was a women's tennis tournament played on outdoor hard courts that was part of the Tier II category of the 1999 WTA Tour. It was the 26th edition of the tournament and took place in Manhattan Beach, California, United States, from August 9 through August 15, 1999. Sixth-seeded Serena Williams won the singles title.

Entrants

Seeds

Other entrants
The following players received wildcards into the singles main draw:
  Alexandra Stevenson
  Corina Morariu
  Iva Majoli

The following players received wildcards into the doubles main draw:
  Julie Halard-Decugis /  Mirjana Lučić

The following players received entry from the singles qualifying draw:

  Magüi Serna
  Anne Kremer
  Inés Gorrochategui
  Lisa Raymond

The following players received entry from the doubles qualifying draw:

  Els Callens /  Debbie Graham

The following players received entry to the doubles division as lucky losers:

  Cătălina Cristea /  Ruxandra Dragomir

Finals

Singles

 Serena Williams defeated  Julie Halard-Decugis, 6–1, 6–4

Doubles

 Arantxa Sánchez Vicario /  Larisa Neiland defeated  Lisa Raymond /  Rennae Stubbs, 6–2, 6–7(5–7), 6–0

External sources
 ITF tournament edition details
 Tournament draws

1999 WTA Tour
1999
1999 in American tennis
1999 in sports in California